Zandra Rose-Marie Flyg (born 31 January 1988 in Stockholm) is a Swedish curler.

She is a two-time Swedish women's champion (2011, 2014) and a 2015 Swedish mixed champion.

Teams

Women's

Mixed

Record as a coach of national teams

Personal life
Her brother is Swedish curler Joakim Flyg. They played together in the 2015 World Mixed Curling Championship and in several Swedish mixed championships.

References

External links
 
 Zandra Flyg – Profile on 2013 Winter Universiade site

Living people
1988 births
Sportspeople from Stockholm
Swedish female curlers
Swedish curling champions
Swedish curling coaches